(Neptune) was the code name of a series of low-to-mid-VHF band airborne intercept radar devices developed by Germany in World War II and used as active targeting devices in several types of aircraft. They were usually combined with a "backwards warning device", indicated by the addition of the letters "V/R" , meaning Forward/Backward). Working in the metre range, Neptun was meant as a stop-gap until scheduled SHF-band devices became available (for instance the FuG 240/E cavity magnetron-based FuG 240 Berlin AI radar).

Variants 

FuG 216: Experimental series to plan the further development. Installed in Fw 190 A-6/R11 and Bf 109 G-6 The aircraft were used by NJGr 10 until March 1944, after which some machines of 6./JG 300 were equipped.
 Manufacturer:  (FFO, German for airborne radio research institut in Bavaria)
 R1 version (backwards warning device)
Frequency: 182MHz
Power: 1.0kW
Transmitting and receiving antennas each consist of twin dipoles, mounted under and above the wings, respectively
 Single display device with distance readout
 V version (for single engined night fighters)
Frequency: 125MHz
Power: 1.2kW
Range: 500 to 3,500m
Antennas in the form of spikes or (Fw 190) as "antlers" on right and left wings

It could be combined with the additional  device to automatically measure the target distance and fire the guns at a set range.
 Manufacturer: FFO
 R2 version (backward warning device)
 J2 version (for single-engined night fighters)
  V/R (combined night fighter and backward warning device for two-engined fighters)
Two switchable frequencies: 158 and 187MHz
Search angle: 120°
Range: 
Spike or "antler" antennas

FuG 218: mass-produced
 Manufacturer: Siemens / FFO
 R3 version (backward warning device)
 J3 version (for single-engined night-fighters)
 V/R version (combined night fighter and backward warning device for two-engined fighters)

Six switchable frequencies: 158 to 187MHz
Search angle: 120°
Range: 
Weight: 
R3 and J3 with spike antennas and V/R with "antler" antennas.
 G/R version (combined night fighter and backward warning device for two-engined fighters)
Only one single device built, replacing the 2kW transmitter with a 30kW transmitter. This device was intended for the Dornier Do 335. "Antler" antennas.

See also 
 List of WW II Japanese airborne radar systems

References 

 (1) TME 11-219 Directory of German Radar Equipment
 Gebhard Aders: Geschichte der Deutschen Nachtjagd, Motorbuch publishing corporation, 1977, 
 :File:Neptun FuG 217.pdf

Aircraft radars
World War II German radars
Military equipment introduced from 1940 to 1944